The speed of sound in any chemical element in the fluid phase has one temperature-dependent value. In the solid phase, different types of sound wave may be propagated, each with its own speed: among these types of wave are longitudinal (as in fluids), transversal, and (along a surface or plate) extensional.

Speed of sound, solid phase

Speed of sound, fluid phases

See also

Notes
 Ref. CRC: Values are "at room temperature" unless noted, and "for normal atmospheric pressure" ("at 1 atm" for gases).
 Ref. WEL: Values refer to  "where possible". Midpoint values are substituted if ranges were given in their original reference. Not specified further, it is assumed from the values that all (except fluids) are for the speed of sound in a thin rod.

References

Sources

WEL
As quoted at http://www.webelements.com/ from this source:
 G.V. Samsonov (Ed.) in Handbook of the physicochemical properties of the elements, IFI-Plenum, New York, USA, 1968.

CRC
As quoted from various sources in an online version of:
 David R. Lide (ed), CRC Handbook of Chemistry and Physics, 84th Edition. CRC Press. Boca Raton, Florida, 2003; Section 14, Geophysics, Astronomy, and Acoustics; Speed of Sound in Various Media

CR2
As quoted from this source in an online version of: David R. Lide (ed), CRC Handbook of Chemistry and Physics, 84th Edition. CRC Press. Boca Raton, Florida, 2003; Section 6, Fluid Properties; Thermal Properties of Mercury
 Vukalovich, M. P., et al., Thermophysical Properties of Mercury, Moscow Standard Press, 1971.

APIH
Dwight E. Gray (ed), American Institute of Physics Handbook. McGraw-Hill. Boca Raton, Florida, New York, 1957.

Other
 88RAB: V.A. Rabinovich, et al. Thermophysical Properties of Neon, Argon, Krypton and Xenon. Selover (Eng. ed.) Hemisphere, Washington DC, 1988.
 Zuckerwar: A. J. Zuckerwar, Handbook of the Speed of Sound in Real Gases. Academic Press, 2002.

Properties of chemical elements
Chemical element data pages
Sound